Windermere is a civil parish in the South Lakeland District of Cumbria, England. It contains 82 listed buildings that are recorded in the National Heritage List for England. Of these, four are listed at Grade I, the highest of the three grades, twelve are at Grade II*, the middle grade, and the others are at Grade II, the lowest grade.  The parish is in the Lake District National Park and lies to the east of Lake Windermere.  It contains the towns of Windermere and Bowness-on-Windermere, the village of Troutbeck Bridge, and the surrounding countryside.  Most of the older listed buildings are farmhouses and farm buildings, and later listed buildings include large houses and associated structures, one of the houses being on an island in the lake.  The other listed buildings include churches and items in churchyards, public houses and hotels, bridges, a drinking fountain, and boathouses.


Key

Buildings

References

Citations

Sources

Lists of listed buildings in Cumbria
Listed